Gymnastics events have been staged at the Olympic Games since 1896. French female gymnasts have participated in every Summer Olympics since 1928, except for 1932, 1936, and 1980. A total of 64 female gymnasts have represented France. French women have won one medal at the Olympics: the 2004 uneven bars gold, which was won by Émilie Le Pennec.

Gymnasts

Medalists

See also

 Gymnastics at the Summer Olympics
 List of Olympic medalists in gymnastics (women)

References

France
Gymnasts
Olympic